The Ecomuseum of Cocoa is an ecomuseum located in Cape Coast, Ghana. It is located on the grounds of the still-operating Tikal Cacao Plantation. The museum offers an array of activities including  a chocolate-making demonstration, a re-creation of an ancient Maya rain ritual, and informational topics of cocoa. 

It was established in 2007.

References

See also 
 List of museums in Ghana

Museums in Ghana
Cape Coast
Museums established in 2007
2007 establishments in Ghana